The Ranji Trophy (also known as Mastercard Ranji Trophy for sponsorship reasons) is a domestic first-class cricket championship played in India between multiple teams representing regional and state cricket associations. Board of Control for Cricket in India founded it in 1934, since then it is annually organised across various grounds and stadiums in India. 

The competition currently consists of 38 teams, with all 28 states in India and four of the eight union territories having at least one representation. When it started it was named as 'The Cricket Championship of India', in 1935 it was renamed after Ranjitsinhji who was the first ever Indian who played international cricket, he played for England from 1896–1902. 

The Mumbai cricket team is the most successful team of the tournament by winning it record 41 times.  

Saurashtra cricket team is present title holder by winning 2022-23 Ranji Trophy. It defeated  Bengal cricket team in the final.

History 

The idea of national level first class championship was proposed by BCCI's founder A.S. De Mello.   
The competition was launched following BCCI's meeting at Shimla in July 1934, with the first fixtures taking place in 1934–35 .Initially the tournament was named as 'The cricket championship of India', it later was renamed.  The trophy was donated by Bhupinder Singh, the Maharaja of Patiala in memory of Kumar Shri Ranjitsinhji, Jam Sahib of Nawanagar who had died the previous year. The first match of the competition was held on 4 November 1934 between Madras and Mysore at the Chepauk ground in Madras (Now Chennai). Mumbai (Bombay) have won the tournament the most times with 41 wins including 15 back-to-back wins from 1958–59 to 1972–73. 

In 2015 Paytm became the first company to hold the tournament's title sponsorship right by virtue of BCCI's title sponsorship deal.

The 2020–21 Ranji Trophy tournament was cancelled due to the COVID-19 pandemic, the first season since the tournament's inception that it was not held.

Participants

State and regional teams with first-class status and owned–opeartead by BCCI members play in the Ranji Trophy. While most associations are regional such as the Mumbai Cricket Association, Karnataka State Cricket Association while Railways, Services, are pan-Indian.

Current teams
The following 38 teams currently participate in the Ranji Trophy:

 Andhra
 Arunachal Pradesh†
 Assam
 Baroda
 Bengal
 Bihar
 Chhattisgarh
 Chandigarh†
 Delhi
 Goa
 Gujarat
 Haryana
 Himachal Pradesh
 Hyderabad (Telangana)
 Jammu and Kashmir
 Jharkhand
 Karnataka (Mysore)
 Kerala
 Madhya Pradesh
 Maharashtra
 Manipur†
 Meghalaya†
 Mizoram†
 Mumbai (Bombay)
 Nagaland†
 Odisha (Orissa)
 Pondicherry†
 Punjab
 Railways
 Rajasthan (Rajputana)
 Saurashtra (Kathiawar)
 Sikkim†
 Services (Army)
 Tamil Nadu (Madras)
 Tripura
 Uttar Pradesh (United Provinces)
 Uttarakhand†
 Vidarbha

† denotes newly added teams from the 2018–19 season

Defunct teams
The following teams have appeared in the Ranji Trophy, but no longer do so:
 Central India (1934/35 – 1940/41)
 Central Provinces and Berar (1934/35 – 1949/50)
 Northern India (1934/35 – 1946/47)
 Sind (1934/35 – 1947/48)
 Southern Punjab (1934/35 – 1951/52, 1959/60 – 1967/68)
 Western India (1934/35 – 1945/46)
 Nawanagar (1936/37 – 1947/48)
 North West Frontier Province (1937/38 – 1946/47)
 Holkar (1941/42 – 1954/55)
 Gwalior (1943/44)
 Patiala/Patiala and Eastern Punjab States Union (1948/49, 1953/54 – 1958/59)
 Eastern Punjab (1950/51 – 1959/60)
 Travancore-Cochin (1951/52 – 1956/57)
 Madhya Bharat (1955/56 – 1956/57)
 Northern Punjab (1960/61 – 1967/68)

Stadiums

Format
From the Ranji Trophy's inception until the 2001 season (with the exception of 1948–49 season), the teams were grouped geographically into four or five zones – North, West, East, and South, with Central added in 1952–53. Initial matches were played within the zones on a knock-out basis until 1956–57, and thereafter on a league basis, to determine a winner; then, the five individual zone winners competed in a knock-out tournament, leading to a final which decided the winner of the Ranji Trophy. From the 1970–71 season, the knock-out stage was expanded to the top two teams from each zone, a total of ten qualifying teams. This was expanded again to the top three from each zone in 1992–93, a total of fifteen qualifying teams; between 1996–97 and 1999–2000, the fifteen qualifying teams competed in a secondary group stage, with three groups of five teams, and the top two from each group qualified for a six-team knock-out stage; in all other years until 2001–02, a full fifteen-team knock-out tournament was held.

The format was changed in the 2002–03 season with the zonal system abandoned and a two-division structure adopted – the Elite Group, containing fifteen teams, and the Plate Group, containing the rest. Each group had two sub-groups which played a round-robin; the top two from each Elite sub-group then contested a four-team knock-out tournament to determine the winner of the Ranji Trophy. The team which finished last in each Elite sub-group was relegated, and both Plate Group finalists were promoted for the following season. For the 2006–07 season, the divisions were re-labelled the Super League and Plate League respectively.

In the 2008–09 season, this format was adjusted to give both Super League and Plate League teams an opportunity to contest the Ranji Trophy. The top two from each Plate sub-group contested semi-finals; the winners of these two matches then joined the top three from each Super League sub-group in an eight-team knock-out tournament. The winner of this knock-out tournament then won the Ranji Trophy. Promotion and relegation between Super League and Plate League continued as before. In the 2010–11 season, Rajasthan won the Ranji Trophy after beginning the season in the Plate League.

From the 2012–13 season, this format was adjusted slightly. The Super League and Plate League names were abandoned, but the two-tier system remained. The top tier expanded from fifteen teams to eighteen teams, in two sub-groups of nine (known as Group A and Group B, and considered equal in status); and the second tier was reduced to nine teams in a single group (known as Group C). The top three teams from Groups A and B and the top two from Group C contest the knockout phase. The lowest placed team in each of Group A and Group B is relegated to Group C, and the top two from Group C are promoted to the top tier.

For the 2017–18 season, the two-tier system was abandoned to have 4 groups of seven teams each and two quarter-finalists from each group.

From the 2018–19 season, the teams contested in three-tiers. Five teams will qualify for the quarter-finals from the top tier (known as Elite Group A and Group B). Two teams will qualify from the second-tier (Elite Group C) and one team from the lower-tier (Plate Group) for the quarter-finals.

Round-robin matches are four days in length; knockout matches are played for five days. Throughout its history, if there is no outright result in a Ranji Trophy knock-out match, the team leading after the first innings is the winner.

Prior to the 2016–17 season, matches were played at the home ground of one of the two teams taking part. For the 2016–17 competition, the BCCI decided that all games would be staged at a neutral venue.

Points summary
Points in the league stages of both divisions are currently awarded as follows:

Tournament records

† Some sources credit Goel with 636 or 640 wickets instead – see Rajinder Goel article for details.

Winners
The following teams have won the tournament:

Finals appearances by team
Mumbai/Bombay have played in 46 of the 86 finals till 2016–17 and have won total 41 Ranji Trophy championships, the most by any team.

Broadcasting 
Star sports 2 HD, Disney+ Hotstar app airs this trophy live on television and online respectively. BCCI's website runs match highlights.

In popular culture 

 The tournament was featured in Jersey, a 2019, Telugu language Indian film, in which the main protagonist Arjun played by Nani plays 1980s, 1996-97 Ranji trophy for Hyderabad cricket team and make win his team against Mumbai cricket team in the final.

Notes

See also

 Ranji Trophy Winner List
 Cricket in India
 Vijay Hazare Trophy - Indian domestic one day cricket tournament 
 Duleep Trophy
 History of cricket
 List of Ranji Trophy records 
 Sport in India - Overview of sports 
 List of hat-tricks in the Ranji Trophy

References

External links

 Official website of the BCCI
 The Ranji Trophy – Cricinfo
 Ranji Trophy Winners

 
1934 establishments in India
First-class cricket competitions
Indian domestic cricket competitions
Sports leagues established in 1934